Strigatella lugubris is a species of sea snail, a marine gastropod mollusk in the miter snail family.

References

Mitridae
Gastropods described in 1821